Eliran Danin (born March 29, 1984) is a retired Israeli footballer.

Honours
Israel State Cup (1):
2009
Toto Cup (1):
2009-10
Liga Alef (1)
2014-15

References

1984 births
Living people
Jewish Israeli sportspeople
Israeli footballers
Association football defenders
Beitar Jerusalem F.C. players
Beitar Nes Tubruk F.C. players
Hapoel Kfar Saba F.C. players
Maccabi Haifa F.C. players
Maccabi Petah Tikva F.C. players
Hapoel Acre F.C. players
Hapoel Tel Aviv F.C. players
Hapoel Ashkelon F.C. players
Hapoel Afula F.C. players
Hapoel Marmorek F.C. players
Footballers from Netanya
Israeli Premier League players
Israel under-21 international footballers
Israeli people of Egyptian-Jewish descent
Ono Academic College alumni